Bohdan Hrynenko (born 29 May 1995) is a Ukrainian Paralympic swimmer. He represented Ukraine at the 2016 Summer Paralympics held in Rio de Janeiro, Brazil and he won the silver medal in the men's 50 m freestyle S8 event.

At the 2019 World Para Swimming Championships held in London, United Kingdom, he won the gold medal and he set a new world record in the men's 100m backstroke S7 event. He also won the silver medal in the men's 100m freestyle S7 event.

References

External links 
 

1995 births
Living people
Ukrainian male freestyle swimmers
Paralympic swimmers of Ukraine
Paralympic gold medalists for Ukraine
Paralympic silver medalists for Ukraine
Paralympic medalists in swimming
Swimmers at the 2016 Summer Paralympics
Medalists at the 2016 Summer Paralympics
Place of birth missing (living people)
Medalists at the World Para Swimming Championships
Ukrainian male backstroke swimmers
S7-classified Paralympic swimmers
21st-century Ukrainian people